Glen Raymond Broomhill (20 January 1933 – 26 December 2007) was an Australian politician who represented the South Australian House of Assembly seats of West Torrens from 1965 to 1970 and Henley Beach from 1970 to 1979 for the Labor Party. Glen Broomhill's most enduring achievement was as the architect of South Australia's visionary container-deposit legislation. That initiative, one of the first of its kind in the world, continues to stand as a landmark to environmental awareness.

Early life
Glen Raymond Broomhill was born in Adelaide on 20 January 1933. A child of the Depression era, he saw his father, Joseph, supplement his painter's income by selling mallee roots that he collected while on regular trips to the Riverland. Glen was educated at Richmond Primary School and Goodwood Boys Technical School.
Glen also played Colts football for Glenelg Football Club, and his passion for the Tigers remained undiminished until his passing

Early career
At the age of 16 Glen left school to serve an apprenticeship as a dental technician. He began his career as a dental mechanic and was closely involved with the Australian Labor Party and the union movement and by the age of 25 he was the secretary of the Miscellaneous Workers Union. Glen became actively involved in the trade union movement. In 1956 he was elected as an organiser of the South Australian branch of the Federal Miscellaneous Workers Union and, within two years, at just 25 he became the union's state secretary as well as its federal vice president. Glen's commitment to the union's membership was highlighted by the fact that he was an advocate and employee representative on nine wages boards until 1965. That was when he entered state parliament at the election which ended the Playford era of conservatism and brought to office Frank Walsh's Labor government

Political career
At just 32 years of age, Glen's standing within the Electorate district of West Torrens enabled him to increase the majority of the retiring member, Fred Walsh. That was despite him standing against the Liberal and Country League candidate, P.T. Morton, who was a former Sturt and South Australian football champion. Glen's political development was strongly nurtured and influenced by his uncle, the former senator and Labor Party stalwart, Jim Toohey. He also received backing from another influential source, the long-serving federal member for Hindmarsh, Clyde Cameron. Indeed, it was Clyde, bedridden in Canberra with a bout of the mumps in late 1963, who furiously lobbied via long-distance telephone calls to help Glen win preselection for West Torrens.

Glen entered the House of Assembly in 1965 as its youngest member, and he wasted no time in speaking out on behalf of young Australians. In his maiden speech he voiced his concern that people under the age of 30 were ineligible to take up a seat in the Legislative Council. The year after his election, Glen was appointed as government whip, and it was a position that he held in government and opposition until 1970, when Don Dunstan elevated him into what is still regarded as one of the most talented ministries this state has seen. Alongside Don Dunstan, the ministry included such great performers as Des Corcoran, Len King, Hugh Hudson and Geoff Virgo, amongst others. This was a time when the Dunstan government's reforms were the talk of the nation. Don gave South Australia a national voice that far outweighed our size and lifted this state from rock bottom to Australian pre-eminence.

Glen was initially appointed minister for labour and industry. However, within six months, he added to his portfolio the roles of minister for conservation and minister assisting the premier. The fact that he was given the responsibility as the nation's first minister specifically charged with the conservation portfolio speaks volumes for the regard in which he was held.

In his political memoirs, Don Dunstan painted a glowing picture of Glen Broomhill when he said:
"He was a sensitive, conscientious man who brought balance, good sense and concern to all that he did" He then added:
"Jim Toohey's nephew, he exhibited many of his uncle's traits, and his calm and pleasant manner concealed a sharp wit which those who attacked him discovered to their discomfort" Don recounted an example of Glen's rapier-like wit in those memoirs, when he recounted the following:
"Glen grew some sideburns—which, if one looks at the photographs in the House of Assembly gallery, were pretty common around that time; they were certainly very fashionable amongst the younger members at that time—...and one of the dimmer lights...of the LCL questioned him in the chamber about it. Glen rose and said, 'I am unfortunate enough to have large, prominent ears which I do not feel enhance my beauty. I grew additional hair in order to hide an unprepossessing feature, an example I advise the honourable member to follow by growing a moustache and a beard.
It was that dry, understated sense of humour that kindles the fondest memories amongst Glen's family, friends and former colleagues. He was also renowned as one of the keenest billiard players amongst members of parliament"

Over a five-year ministerial career, Glen held a range of portfolios, including fisheries, planning and development, community welfare and tourism. In 1973, he became the state's first minister for recreation and sport. During his tenure as a minister, Glen introduced a series of far- reaching initiatives, including the establishment of the Coast Protection Board, and a large increase in the areas of national parks and river wetlands. He oversaw the establishment of a quarry levy and measures to improve the appearance of the Adelaide Hills face zone.

Glen was also deeply concerned about population growth and overcrowding problems along the ribbon of land between Gawler and Aldinga. For that reason, he was a passionate supporter of the proposed development at Monarto, in addition to being the architect of that project. He was greatly disappointed when the Monarto scheme was later scrapped. That plan certainly attracted its critics but, in retrospect, it looks increasingly wise as well as visionary.

Glen's major legacy was the introduction of the container deposit legislation completed in 1975 that saw cans and bottles reduced drastically as a source of litter across the state. The success of that initiative was largely due to Glen's commitment to the cause and his refusal to back down in the face of fierce industry opposition. Progressive governments throughout the United States and Europe have since embraced the container deposit scheme and calls continue for it to be adopted by other Australian states.

Just weeks after Glen's death at the palliative care unit at the Queen Elizabeth Hospital, Ian Kiernan, the chairman of Clean Up Australia, was in Adelaide singing the praises of our container deposit scheme. This legislation has not only significantly increased the recovery rate of beverage containers in this state, where around 80 per cent of glass bottles are recovered compared with around 36 per cent nationally, but it has also yielded important environmental benefits by reducing annual greenhouse gas emissions by up to 70,000 tonnes of carbon dioxide equivalent. In addition, the scheme is estimated to produce embodied water savings of up to 5 megalitres per year.

Glen Broomhill was just 47 years old when he announced his retirement from politics at the 1979 election. Having stood down from the ministry in 1975 because of his wife Jill's failing health, Glen won the admiration and support of colleagues, constituents and the community when he forwent his political career to care for her full-time. His devotion to his beloved Jill as she battled illness also led him to serve on the board of Multiple Sclerosis South Australia and the Northern Territory for more than a decade.

Glen's commitment to public life remained strong until very recently, as he played an influential role on the board of ETSA, as well as serving as deputy chairman of the power line environment committee.
Glen Broomhill is remembered with deep fondness as a quiet, unassuming man who harboured a great sense of humour and an even stronger sense of family and community.

References

 

Members of the South Australian House of Assembly
2007 deaths
1933 births
Australian Labor Party members of the Parliament of South Australia
20th-century Australian politicians